Perseverance was launched in Virginia in 1797 and was registered in Great Britain in 1799. A privateer captured her in 1800, but the British Royal Navy recaptured her within days. She traded with Baltimore, Brazil, and the Mediterranean. She made one voyage as a whaler that resulted in pirates taking her in 1821, killing her master and at least some of her crew, and burning her.

Career
Perseverance entered Lloyd's Register (LR), in 1799. 

Lloyd's List reported on 11 March 1800 that Perseverance, Norman, master, had been sailing from Baltimore to London when the privateer Mars captured her. However, HMS Nereide recaptured Perseverance and sent her into Plymouth. Nereide had recaptured the American ship Perseverance, of Baltimore, on 3 March. She was carrying a cargo valued at £30,000.

Captain David Isbetser (or Ibitser) acquired a letter of marque on 26 January 1808. The Register of Shipping for 1809 shows Perseverances master as D. Isbetser, her owner as Buckle & Co., and her trade as London–. She had damages repaired in 1806.

Fate
Captain Clark sailed Perseverance from England on 1 February 1820, bound for whaling off the coast of Peru. By May 20 she was around Cape Horn, and she was at Lima in October−November. Initially she was reported to have been seen hauled on shore at St Mary's (Santa María Island, Chile  – ), and stripped, and her casks and other articles strewn along the shore. She had been anchored at Santa Maria in March 1821 when a boat belonging to the pirate Vicente Benavides captured her; she was later burnt in the Tubul River. Benavides had murdered Clark, two mates, and part of her crew.

Notes

Citations

1797 ships
Ships built in the United States
Age of Sail merchant ships of England
Captured ships
Whaling ships
Maritime incidents in March 1821
Maritime incidents in October 1821
Acts of piracy
Piracy in the Pacific Ocean
Ships attacked and captured by pirates